World War I Memorial may refer to:

United States

 District of Columbia War Memorial, on the National Mall
 National World War I Memorial (Washington, D.C.), in Pershing Park
 World War I Memorial (Norfolk, Connecticut)
 World War I Memorial (Boston), Massachusetts
 National World War I Museum and Memorial, Kansas City, Missouri
 World War I Memorial (Atlantic City, New Jersey)
 World War I Memorial (Salem, Oregon)
 World War I Memorial (Berwick, Pennsylvania)
 World War I Memorial (East Providence, Rhode Island)
 World War I Memorial (Salt Lake City) or The Pagoda, Utah

Other countries
 World War I Memorial (Tiruchirappalli), Tamil Nadu, India

See also
 World War I memorials